Giovanni II Valente (Genoa, 1280 – Genoa, 1360) was the third doge of the Republic of Genoa. His time in office was marked by the crushing defeat of the city against the Venetians at the naval Battle of Alghero. Giovanni had already asked to succeed the first doge of the Republic in December 1345 but had turn down the responsibility.

A doge at war
After the death of his predecessor, Giovanni I da Murta, a short crisis of succession ensued. The popolani supported Luchino Fieschi while the patricians and the partisans of the late doge backed his son, Tommaso da Murta. Giovanni Valente finally emerged as a candidate of compromise and was elected on January 9, 1350.

When Valente abandoned the careful foreign policy of his predecessor and tried to expel entirely the Venetians from the Black Sea,  the tension between Genoa and Venice erupted into open warfare. Each navy plundered the merchant fleets of the opposing side in the Eastern Mediterranean. Venice formed an alliance with Byzantium and the kingdom of Aragon, forcing the Genoese to seek the support of the Ottomans. On November 17, 1350, to pay for the expenses of the war, the Republic had to levy a forced-loan of 300,000 lire at an interest of 10% from an association of creditors known as the Compera imposita per gerra Venetorum.

On March 9, 1352, the Genoese fleet under the command of Paganino Doria won a naval victory against the coalition near Constantinople. The following year, in August, near Alghero, on the island of Sardinia, the Genoese navy, under Antonio de' Grimaldi was crushed by the Venetians.

Resignation
Confronted with the threat of a new civil war breaking out in the city and the prospect of foreign invasion, the council had to call for the support of the Visconti of Milan. The doge lost any executive power and Giovanni Valente had to resign from the dogate on October 8, 1353 and the position became vacant. He died seven years later and may have been buried at the church of San Bartolomeo dell'Olivella in Genoa.

References

1360 deaths
14th-century Doges of Genoa
Year of birth unknown